Abarlaq-e Olya (also Romanized as Abarlāq-e ‘Olyā; also known as Abarlāq-e Bālā, Avala Bāla, and Avaleh-ye Bālā) is a village in Khorram Rud Rural District, in the Central District of Tuyserkan County, Hamadan Province, Iran. At the 2006 census, its population was 167, in 36 families.

References 

Populated places in Tuyserkan County